The Presidential Order of Excellence is an award given by the President of Georgia to individuals in culture, education, science, art, sport, and other fields, for significant achievements and meritorious service for Georgia. 

The award was established on July 31, 2009 by the Parliament of Georgia and is accompanied by an additional monetary award of 1,000 Georgian lari.

Recipients

Individuals awarded in 2010 
In 2010, the Presidential Order of Excellence was awarded by President Mikheil Saakashvili to 55 individuals. These included the Patriarch of Georgia Ilia II, Guram Dochanashvili, Iliko Sukhishvili, Ekaterine Meiering-Mikadze, Davit Darchiashvili, Roland Akhalaia, Mamuka Khazaradze, Nino Ananiashvili, Nani Bregvadze, Paata Burchuladze, Iulon Gagoshidze, Vladimer Gurgenidze, Niaz Diasamidze, Irakli Ezugbaia, Nikoloz Vacheishvili, Ekaterine Zghuladze, Ramaz Nikolaishvili, Nino Sukhishvili, Ilia Sukhishvili, and Jemal Tchkuaseli.

Individuals awarded in 2011 
In 2011, the Presidential Order of Excellence was awarded by President Mikheil Saakashvili to 35 individuals. These included Igor Kokoskov, Giorgi Nizharadze, Gela Charkviani, James Richard Dixon, Éric Fournier Nino Katamadze, Tamar Kovziridze, Sergi Kapanadze, Raphaël Glucksmann, Kakha Baindurashvili, Giorgi Vashadze, Davit Sakvarelidze, and Viktor Yushchenko.

Individuals awarded in 2012 
In 2012, the Presidential Order of Excellence was awarded to by President Mikheil Saakashvili 43 individuals. These included Zaza Korinteli, Giorgi Ushikishvili, Davit Gogichaishvili, Donald Trump, Temur Iakobishvili, Levan Varshalomidze, and Tsezar Chocheli.

Individuals awarded in 2013 
In 2013, the Presidential Order of Excellence was awarded by President Mikheil Saakashvili and President Giorgi Margvelashvili to 154 individuals. These included Akaki Bobokhidze, Urszula Doroszewska, Vitali Klitschko, Zaal Udumashvili, Akaki Gogichaishvili, Giorgi Liponava, Pavle Kublashvili, Nika Tabatadze, Davit Kikalishvili, Zurab Chiaberashvili, Eldar Shengelaia, Natia Bandzeladze, Irma Nadirashvili, Zaal Samadashvili, Nika Gvaramia, Davit Kirkitadze, Bayar Shahin, Alexander Lukashenko, Viktor Yanukovych, Serzh Sargsyan, Almazbek Atambayev, Islam Karimov, Mehriban Aliyeva, Donald Tusk, Manana Manjgaladze, Zurab Darchiashvili, Iakob Zakareishvili, Giorgi Tughushi, Shota Malashkhia, Giorgi Karbelashvili, Giorgi Kandelaki, and Aleksadre Kvitashvili.

Individuals awarded in 2014 
In 2014, the Presidential Order of Excellence was awarded by President Giorgi Margvelashvili to 4 individuals. These were Lavrenti Managadze, Sheikh-ul-Islam Gaji Allahshukur Pasha-Zade, Jamlet Khukhashvili, and Roman Shakarishvili.

Individuals awarded in 2015 
In 2015, the Presidential Order of Excellence was awarded by President Giorgi Margvelashvili to 5 individuals. These were Givi Margvelashvili, Nona Gaprindashvili, Mikhail Yakobus Lentz, Avtandil Kvezereli-Kopadze, and Nodar Tsintsadze.

Individuals awarded in 2016 
In 2016, the Presidential Order of Excellence was awarded by President Giorgi Margvelashvili to individuals including Professor Givi Ghambashidze, Olympic wrestling champions Vladimer Khinchegashvili and Lasha Talakhadze, and posthumously awarded diplomats Revaz Adamia, Giorgi Burduli, and Levan Melikidze.

Individuals awarded in 2017 

In 2017, the Presidential Order of Excellence was awarded by President Giorgi Margvelashvili to individuals.

Individuals awarded in 2018 
As part of Georgia's 100th anniversary, President Giorgi Margvelashvili awarded the Presidential Order of Excellence to 23 Olympic champions for their achievements in sports and contributions to the worldwide promotion of Georgia. These individuals were:

 Alexander Anpilogov – Olympic champion in handball

 Giorgi Asanidze - Olympic champion in weightlifting

 Vakhtang Blagidze - Olympic champion in Greco-Roman wrestling

 Davit Gobejishvili - Olympic champion in free wrestling

 Vladimer Gogoladze - Olympic champion in sports gymnastics

 Zurab Zviadauri - Olympic champion in Judo

 Levan Tediashvili - two-time Olympic champion in free wrestling
 Vazha Kacharava - Olympic champion in volleyball

 Gela Ketashvili - Olympic champion in football
 Kakhi Kakhiashvili – three-time Olympic champion in weightlifting
 Manuchar Kvirkvelia - Olympic champion in Greco-Roman wrestling
 Ketevan Losaberidze - Olympic champion in archery
 Revaz Mindorashvili - Olympic champion in free wrestling
 Roman Rurua - Olympic champion in Greco-Roman wrestling
 Nino Salukvadze – Olympic champion in shooting
 Viktor Saneev - three-time Olympic champion in athletics
 Robert Shavlakadze - Olympic champion in athletics
 Lasha Shavdatuashvili - Olympic champion in Judo
 Raphael Chimishkyan - Olympic champion in weightlifting
 Irakli Tsirekidze - Olympic champion in Judo
 Leri Khabelov – Olympic champion in free wrestling
 Shota Khabareli - Olympic champion in Judo
 Davit Khakhaleishvili - Olympic champion in Judo

Heads of state awarded 
Several current and former heads of state have been awarded the Presidential Order Excellence, including

 Viktor Yushchenko, 3rd President of Ukraine, awarded in 2011
 Donald Trump, 45th President of the United States, awarded in 2012
 Alexander Lukashenko, President of Belarus, awarded in 2013
 Viktor Yanukovych, 4th President of Ukraine, awarded in 2013
 Serzh Sargsyan, 3rd President of Armenia, awarded in 2013
 Almazbek Atambayev, 4th President of Kyrgyzstan, awarded in 2013
 Islam Karimov, 1st President of Uzbekistan. awarded in 2013

See also 

 Orders, decorations, and medals of Georgia
 Presidential Medal of Freedom

References 

Orders, decorations, and medals of Georgia (country)
Awards established in 2009